Rob Morris was a prominent American poet and Freemason. He also created the first ritual for what was to become the Order of the Eastern Star.

Early life
Rob Morris was born on August 31, 1818, in New York City.  His father's name was Robert Peckham (1789-1825) and his mother was Charlotte Lavinia Shaw Peckham (1786-1837).  Charlotte and Robert Peckham had five children.  The first two, John Fales Peckham and Mary Shaw Peckham, died in infancy.  The third child, John Anson Peckham was born in 1816 followed by Robert Peckham (Morris) in 1818 and sister Charlotte Fales Peckham in 1821.  All three children were born in New York City where their father, Robert, worked as an accountant at 99 Greenwich at a marble yard.  The Peckham family lived at 26 Rector Street.  In 1821, the couple split and mother Charlotte left her husband and returned to Taunton, Massachusetts, taking their infant daughter, Charlotte.  The two boys stayed with their father in New York City.  In 1825 Robert Peckham died in a NY hospital and the two sons went to live with their mother and sister. Robert Peckham (Morris) attended the Bristol Academy in Tauntan and during this time changed his surname from Peckham to Morris. It has yet to be ascertained why Robert Peckham changed his name to Rob Morris. Throughout most of Morris's adult life, he continued correspondence with this brother, John and sister Charlotte.

At age 18 Rob Morris left his family to go out West and seek his fortune.  He was teaching school at the DeSoto Academy in northwest Mississippi when he met his wife, Charlotte Mendenhall.  Charlotte's family lived in Germantown, Tennessse close to Memphis. Charlotte's parents were Samuel and Sarah Mendenhall. Rob Morris and Charlotte Mendenhall married on May 26, 1841.

Rob and Charlotte Morris moved to Oxford, Mississippi where Rob taught at the Sylvan Academy for boys.  At Oxford, on March 5, 1846 at the Gathright Lodge, Morris came "into the light" of freemasonry and became a Mason.  James M. Howry, past grand master and high priest of Mississippi, initiated the 28-year-old Morris into freemasonry.

Eastern Star
After he became a Mason on March 5, 1846, he became convinced that there needed to be a way for female relatives of Masons to share in some measure in the benefits of Freemasonry. While teaching at the Eureka Masonic College ("The Little Red Brick School Building") in Pickens, Mississippi in 1849-1850, he wrote Eastern Star's first ritual, titled The Rosary of the Eastern Star. He organized a "Supreme Constellation" in 1855 to charter Star chapters. In 1866, because of his planned travel abroad, he handed over the organizational authority of Eastern Star to Robert Macoy.

He later served as Grand Master of the Grand Lodge of Kentucky in 1858-9. Upon being given a job as professor of the Masonic University, he moved to La Grange, Kentucky in 1860.

Poetry
Over the years, he wrote over 400 poems, many of which were devoted to Eastern Star and Masonry. While traveling in the Holy Land, he wrote the words to the hymn "O Galilee". In 1854, he wrote "The Level and the Square", which may be his best-known poem.

Poeta Laureado
Because of his many works on Masonic subjects, on December 17, 1884, he was crowned the "Poet Laureate of Freemasonry", an honor which had not been granted since the death of Robert Burns in 1796.

Death
His health began to fail in 1887, and in June 1888, he became paralyzed. He died on July 31, 1888, and is buried at La Grange, Kentucky. The Rob Morris Home is kept as a shrine to Rob Morris by the Kentucky Grand Chapter of the Order of the Eastern Star.
He and his wife are buried at the Valley of Rest within the town limits of LaGrange, KY.

See also
Charles Netter, Zionist leader, Jewish Freemason and co-founder of the Alliance Israélite Universelle

References

Sources
 Allen, Gloria Seaman. 1996. "Equally Their Due: Female Education in Antebellum Alexandria." Historic Alexander Quarterly. Summer 1996. Vol. 1, No. 2. pp. 1–11.
 Austin, Rev. Thomas R., LL.D. 1876. The Well Spent Life: A Brotherly Testimonial to the Masonic Career of Robert Morris, LL.D., Limited Edition. Louisville, KY.: Rev. Thomas Austin.
 Beaderstadt, Rev. Jan L. 2003. The Grand Luminary: A Look at the Life of Rob Morris. Turner, MI.: Coffee Times Press.
 Beresniak, Daniel. 2000. Symbols of Freemasonry. New York, NY.:  Barnes and Nobles Books.
 Cabaniss, Allen, P.G.M. 1976. "Freemasonry in Mississippi." (February 11, 1976). Meridian, MS.: Grand Lodge of Mississippi.
 Cato, Juanita, P.G.M.  1972. “The Order of the Eastern Star in Mississippi.” The Scottish Rite Magazine, November, 1972. 
 Colton, J.H. 1855. "Mississippi Map No. 32." New York, NY. J.H. Colton & Co.
 Compton, Lisa. n.d. "The Order of the Eastern Star –Its Taunton Connection." OCHS Collection, Taunton, MA.: Old Colony Historical Society. 
 Declaration of Sentiments. July 20, 1848. "The Elizabeth Cady Stanton and Susan B. Anthony Papers Project." Accessed 09/12/2014. http://www.ecssba.rutgers.edu/docs/ecsbday.html.
 Dotson, Raymond. 1984. “Detailed Information on Rob Morris with Internet Notes of Bonita Hillmer." August 28, 1984. Lecture at Goldsboro Chapter, # 54, August 24, 1984. 
 Moore, Charles. (1847). "Freemason’s Monthly Magazine." Vol. 6. Boston, MA: Tuttle & Dennett.
 General Grand Chapter, Order of the Eastern Star (2014), http://www.easternstar.org
 Grand Secretary.1846. Extract of the Proceedings of the Grand Lodge of Mississippi: Grand Annual Communication. 1846-1847. p. 67. Natchez, MI: Free Traders Office. 
 Hamlett, Barksdale. 1914. History of Education in Kentucky. Frankfort, KY.: Kentucky Dept. of Education.
 Harvard University Open Library. 2014.  "Cholera Epidemics in the 19th Century, Contagion: Historical Views of Diseases and Epidemics." Accessed 10/30/2014. 
 Hillmer, Bonita. 2014. "Morris-Peckham-Fales ". Accessed 05/14/2014.
 Hexon, Meg & Staff. 2012. Howry Family Papers 1842-1883. University of Michigan: William L. Clements Library. Accessed 08/09/2014. http://quoid.lib.umich.edu/c/clementsmss./untmss/umich-wmcl-M-2328how?view=text.
 Hitt, J. B, II.  2014.  "J. B. Hitt Genealogy Site." Accessed 02/22/2014. http://wc.rootsweb.ancestry.com/cgi-bin/igm
 Hunter, Louis. 1949. Steamboats on the Western Rivers: An Economic and Technological History.Cambridge, MA.: Harvard Press.
 Kenaston, Jean M’Kee. 1917. History of the Order of the Eastern Star with an Authentic Biography of the Founder, Rob Morris, L.L.D., Bonestreet, S.D.: The Torch Press.
 Lazar, Zolton. 1997-2014. "Royal Solomon Mother Lodge in Israel." Lecture delivered before the John Ross Robertson Chapter of the Philalethes Society, Toronto, Canada, Reprint "The Israeli Freemason." Accessed 05/10/2014. http://www.mastermason/fmisrael/royal.html.
 Lexington Royal Arch Chapter.1848. Royal Arch Chapter Lodge Book. Nov. 9, 1848. Holmes County, Mississippi: Lexington Royal Arch Chapter Nine.
 Longworth’s New York Register and City Directory For the Forty-Third Year of American Independence. January 1, 1818. "List of Duties, Banks, Insurance Companies & Post Office Establishment Sic., January 1, 1818." Date Accessed: 01/30/2014. 
 MacNulty, W. Kirk. 1991.  Freemasonry: A Journey through Ritual and Symbol. New York, NY.: Thames & Hudson, New York, NY.
 Maryland Historical Society. 2011. William Wirt Papers, 1784-1864. Date Accessed 10/30/2014: http: www.mdhs.org/findingais/william-wirt-papers-1784-1864-ms-1011.
 Massachusetts, Town and Vital Records. 1620-1988. [database online].  Provo, UT.: Accessed 02/21/2014.
 Morris Family Collection. (1847-1859). Unpublished Letters & Correspondence of the Morris Family. LaGrange, KY.: Kentucky Chapter, Order of the Eastern Star, Courtesy of Davis Morgan & Margie Morgan Applegate. 
 Morris, Rob. (1860). Freemason’s Almanac. Louisville, KY.: Morris & Monsarrat.
 —. 1876. Freemasonry in the Holy Land or Handmarks of Hiram’s Builders. Chicago, ILL: Knight &  Leonard, Printers. 
 —. 1883. William Morgan or Political Anti-Masonry; Its Rise, Growth and Decadence. New York, NY.: Robert MaCoy, Masonic Publisher.
 —. 1852. The Faithful Slave. Boston, MA: Ossian E. Dodge.
 —. 1859. The History of Freemasonry in Kentucky. Louisville, KY.: Rob Morris, Pb.
 —. 1852. The Lights and Shadows of Freemasonry, consisting of Masonic Tales, Songs and Sketches. Louisville, KY.:  J.F. Brennan, Pb.
 —. 1875. Masonic Odes and Poems. New York, NY. William T. Anderson.
 —. 1895. The Poetry of Freemasonry. Chicago, ILL.: The Werner Company.
 —. 1868-1869. The Voice of Masonry, Devoted to Masonic and General Literature, Original and Selected. Louisville, KY.: B.F. Brennan. 
 National Register of Historic Places. 1970. "Rob Morris Little Red Schoolhouse, O.E.S. Shrine Eureka Masonic College." Entry No. 70.11.28.0014. 
 New England Historical and Genealogical Register.1875. "New England Historical and Genealogical Register." Vol. 29, p. 204.
 Oldham County Historical Society. (n.d.) "Kentucky Masonic College: Funk Seminary Notebook". LaGrange, KY: J. Chilton Barnett Archives. 
 —. (1889). "Rev. H. R. Coleman Circular". LaGrange, KY: J. Chilton Barnett Archives.
 —. (1888). Rob Morris Funeral Procession papers and notebook. LaGrange, KY: J. Chilton Barnett Archives.
 —. (1884). " Rob Morris Poet Laureate Papers". LaGrange, KY: J. Chilton Archives.
 Pond, Annie M. 1950.  Interesting Historical Data. Order of the Eastern Star, Order of the Eastern Star, New York, NY. Order of the Eastern Star of the State of New York.
 Robertson, J. Ross. (1899). The History of Freemasonry in Canada From Its Introduction in 1749.Vol. II. Toronto, Canada. The Hunter Rose Co.
 Rosenburg, Charles E. 1987. The Cholera Years: The U. S. in 1832, 1849, 1866. Chicago, ILL.: University of Chicago Press.
 Ross, Peter. 1899. A Standard History of Freemasonry, New York, NY.: The Lewis Publishing Co.
 Rule, Lucien. 1922.  Pioneering in Masonry: The Life and Times of Rob Morris. Louisville, KY.: Brandt & Connors Co., Inc.
 Taunton Genealogy (in Bristol County).2014. "Taunton Vital Records." Accessed 03/13/2014. http://massachusetts-genealogy.com/Taunton-Genealogy.cfm.
 Peters, Gerhard. 2014. "Election of 1832." The American Presidency Project. Accessed 09/30/2014. http://www.presidency.ucsb.edu/showelection.php?year=1832.
 The Committee. 1884. "A Monument of Gratitude". Louisville, KY.: The Committee of the Order of the Eastern Star. 
 The Freemason Monthly. 1848.  The Freemason Monthly Magazine. November, 1848. Boston, MA. pp. 26–27. 
 United States Congress. 2014. Biographical Directory of the United States Congress: Grundy, Felix, (1777-1840), Accessed March 14, 2014. http://gov/scripts/biodisplay.pl?index=g000509.
 Valso. 2014. "What Happened to Yellow Jack Part II: Antebellum Mobile and the South." Accessed October 30, 2014. http://modmobilian.com/2014/01/what-happened-to-yellow- jack-part-ii-mobile-the-south.
 Voorhis, Harold Van Buren. 1958. The Eastern Star: The Evolution from a Rite to an Order.MaCoy Publishing and Masonic Supply Co., Inc., Richmond, VA.: MaCoy Publishing and Masonic Supply Co., Inc.

1818 births
1888 deaths
People from La Grange, Kentucky
Poets from Massachusetts
American Freemasons
Order of the Eastern Star
Writers from Boston
People from Oxford, Mississippi
19th-century American poets
American male poets
19th-century American male writers